F63 or F.63 may refer to:
 Farman F.63, a French aircraft
 , a Royal Navy L-class destroyer
 , a Royal Navy Whitby-class anti-submarine frigate